The 2010–11 Biathlon World Cup - World Cup 8 was held in Fort Kent, Maine, United States, from 10 February until 13 February 2011.

Schedule of events 
The time schedule of the event stands below

Medal winners

Men

Women

Achievements
 Best performance for all time

 , 10th place in Sprint
 , 30th place in Sprint
 , 40th place in Sprint
 , 51st place in Sprint
 , 64th place in Sprint
 , 38th place in Pursuit
 , 7th place in Mass Start
 , 9th place in Mass Start
 , 9th place in Sprint
 , 26th place in Sprint
 , 27th place in Sprint and 24th place in Pursuit
 , 48th place in Sprint
 , 9th place in Pursuit

References 

2010–11 Biathlon World Cup
Biathlon World Cup - World Cup 8
Fort Kent, Maine
February 2011 sports events in the United States
Biathlon competitions in the United States
Sports competitions in Maine
2011 in sports in Maine